Andreas Breynck (4 July 1890 – 12 July 1957) was a German athlete.  He competed in the 1908 Summer Olympics in London. Breynck placed second in his initial semifinal heat of the 1500 metres with a time of 4:30.0, not advancing to the final. In the 800 metres, Breynck placed second in his initial semifinal heat and did not advance to the final.  His time was 2:06.0.

International career
On 16 May 1910, he played his only international, against a Belgium. Like Alfred Berghausen, Lothar Budzinski-Kreth and Christian Schilling, who wanted to follow the match, Breynk was called to the court at short notice by the auditorium been because the team had arrived with only seven players. The match in front of 8,000 spectators in Duisburg, in which he came in for Peco Bauwens in the 55th minute, was lost under these circumstances, however, clearly with 0: 3.

References

Sources
 
 
 

1890 births
1957 deaths
German male middle-distance runners
Olympic athletes of Germany
Athletes (track and field) at the 1908 Summer Olympics
Association football forwards
German footballers
Germany international footballers